Elmar Kits ( 1913 – 24 March 1972) was an Estonian painter.

References

1913 births
1972 deaths
People from Tartu
People from the Governorate of Livonia
20th-century Estonian painters
20th-century Estonian male artists
People's Artists of the Estonian Soviet Socialist Republic (visual arts)
Soviet painters